Alan Dean (1938–2018) was Archdeacon of the Army and Deputy Chaplain General to the Forces from 1993 to 1995.

Dean was educated at  the University of Hull and ordained in 1964. After a curacy at Clitheroe and then Chaplain to the Bishop of Burnley]] he was with the Royal Army Chaplains' Department from 1968 to 1995. He was also an Honorary Chaplain to the Queen from 1987 to 1993.

References

Church of England archdeacons (military)
Honorary Chaplains to the Queen
20th-century English Anglican priests
Alumni of the University of Hull
1938 births
Living people
Royal Army Chaplains' Department officers